Niphona borneensis is a species of beetle in the family Cerambycidae. It was described by Stephan von Breuning in 1938. It is known from Borneo and the Philippines.

References

borneensis
Beetles described in 1938